This is a list of Maltese football transfers for the 2018–19 summer transfer window by club. Only transfers of clubs in the Maltese Premier League and Maltese First Division are included.

The summer transfer window opened on 1 July 2018, although a few transfers may take place prior to that date. The window closed at midnight on 31 August 2018. Players without a club may join one at any time, either during or in between transfer windows.

Maltese Premier League

Balzan
Manager:  Marko Micovic

In:

 
 

Out:

Birkirkara
Manager:  Paul Zammit

In:

 
 
 
 
 
 
 

Out:

Floriana
Manager:  Nicolas Hernan Chiesa

In:

 
 
 
 

Out:

Gżira United
Manager:  Darren Abdilla

In:

 
 
 

Out:

Ħamrun Spartans
Manager:  Giovanni Tedesco 

In:

 

Out:

Hibernians
Manager:  Stefano Sanderra

In:

Out:

Mosta
Manager:  Johann Scicluna

In:

 

Out:

Pietà Hotspurs
Manager:  Ramon Zammit

In:

 

Out:

Qormi
Manager:  Brian Spiteri

In:

Out:

Senglea Athletic
Manager:  Steve D'Amato

In:

Out:

Sliema Wanderers
Manager:  John Buttigieg

In:

 
 

Out:

St. Andrews
Manager:  Michael Woods

In:

Out:

Tarxien Rainbows
Manager:  Jose Borg

In:

Out:

Valletta
Manager:  Danilo Dončić

In:

 

Out:

Maltese First Division

Lija Athletic
Manager: 

In:

Out:

Marsa
Manager: 

In:

Out:

Mqabba
Manager: 

In:

Out:

Naxxar Lions
Manager: 

In:

Out:

Qrendi
Manager: 

In:

Out:

San Gwann
Manager: 

In:

Out:

Sirens
Manager:  Vince Carbonaro 

In:

Out:

Vittoriosa Stars
Manager: 

In:

Out:

Żebbuġ Rangers
Manager: 

In:

Out:

Zejtun Corinthians
Manager: 

In:

Out:

References

External links
 Official Website

Transfers summer
2018
Maltese